Horace Hao Loh (born 28 May 1937) is a Chinese-born Taiwanese biochemist.

Loh graduated from National Taiwan University and completed a doctorate in biochemistry from the University of Iowa, as did his friend Yuan-Chuan Lee. Loh then moved to the University of California, San Francisco as a postdoctoral researcher under Eddy Leong Way, after which he joined the UCSF Medical Center faculty. In 1989, Loh began teaching at the University of Minnesota, where he was named Frederick and Alice Stark Professor of Pharmacology, and later appointed to a Regents Professorship. Since 1986, Loh has been a member of Academia Sinica.

References

1937 births
Living people
Taiwanese biochemists
National Taiwan University alumni
University of Iowa alumni
University of California, San Francisco faculty
University of Minnesota faculty
Members of Academia Sinica
20th-century Taiwanese scientists
21st-century Taiwanese scientists
20th-century chemists
21st-century chemists
20th-century biologists
21st-century biologists
Taiwanese expatriates in the United States